PDAG may refer to:
 Propositional directed acyclic graph, a data structure in computer science
 Mixed graph or partially directed acyclic graph